Devonshire Downs, sometimes informally called The Downs, was a horse racing track and multipurpose event facility in Northridge, California. It was located at the southwest corner of Devonshire Street and Zelzah Avenue, east of Reseda Boulevard. The site is now owned by the California State University, Northridge, which renamed it North Campus, and leased in part to Medtronics MiniMed.

In 1943, Helen Dillman and Pete Spears purchased 40 acres for $80,000 with plans to construct a harness racing track, but a wartime construction moratorium temporarily put the project on hold. Weekly Sunday afternoon harness races, called matinees, began in 1946. The State of California bought the property for $140,000 in 1948, at which time it also became the home of the 51st District Agricultural Association's annual San Fernando Valley Fair.

During the 1950s, as the San Fernando Valley's population boomed and tract housing rapidly replaced Northridge's citrus groves and small ranches, the venue increasingly served to host a wide variety of mostly non-equestrian expositions, festivals, carnivals, concerts, swap meets, rallies and other events. These alternative uses eventually predominated. A new California State College campus was built on adjacent land and opened in 1958 as San Fernando Valley State College, which soon became the owner of Devonshire Downs.

During the 1960s, poor track maintenance and declining interest in the sport led to the end of horse racing at the facility. The last race horse was removed in 1971. In the same year, the college, which became California State University, Northridge (CSUN) in 1972, built a football stadium on some of the acreage. Other parts of the property continued to be put to diverse uses. During the first half of the 1980s, Devonshire Downs was the venue for numerous hardcore punk rock shows.

In 2001, the football stadium and practically everything else was razed and most of the land was leased out for development as a private industrial park.

Devonshire Downs is most widely known for hosting the three-day Newport Pop Festival in June 1969, featuring Jethro Tull, Jimi Hendrix, Joe Cocker and nearly thirty other top acts.

References

American football venues in Los Angeles
Defunct college football venues
Defunct horse racing venues in California
Demolished sports venues in California
Cal State Northridge Matadors football
Sports venues in Los Angeles